Fanny Mallette (born September 5, 1975) is a Canadian actress.

Biography
She was nominated for a Genie Award for Best Performance by an Actress in a Supporting Role for her role in Continental, a Film Without Guns (Continental, un film sans fusil). She has twice been nominated for a Jutra Award for Best Actress in The Orphan Muses (Les Muses orphelines) and A Girl at the Window (Une jeune fille à la fenêtre). Her other credits include Nos étés, Cheech, The Master Key (Grande Ourse: La Clé des possibles), 7 Days (Les 7 jours du Talion) and Scoop.

She won "Best Actress" at the film festival Pacific Meridian in 2011.

Selected filmography
The Woman Who Drinks (La Femme qui boit) - 2001
The Broken Line (La ligne brisée) - 2008
7 Days (Les 7 jours du Talion) - 2010
Vertige - 2012
Arwad - 2013
You're Sleeping Nicole (Tu dors Nicole) - 2014
Chorus - 2015
With Love (L'Amour) - 2019
Apapacho - 2019
Wars (Guerres) - 2021
Virage - 2021

References

External links 

1975 births
Living people
Actresses from Montreal
Canadian film actresses
Canadian television actresses
21st-century Canadian actresses
Best Supporting Actress Jutra and Iris Award winners